Sean Richard Dulake (born June 9, 1984) is an American actor and director.

Early life
Dulake was born on June 9, 1984, in Los Angeles, California, to a British father and Korean mother. He studied theatre arts and business at Boston University. He went on to study Sanford Meisner's acting technique in Los Angeles, where he partook in various theater and sketch comedy performances. 

Dulake moved to South Korea in 2007 to learn more about his Korean heritage and attended Seoul National University for a year to learn how to speak Korean.

Career 
Dulake made his television debut in 2010 as doctor Horace Newton Allen on SBS’ medical drama Jejungwon about the first Western medical institution in Korea. He has gone on to portray diverse variety of characters, from a double agent in the action series Athena: Goddess of War'''' to a famous chef in the family drama Feast of the Gods.

Dulake directed and hosted a short documentary for Discovery Channel's television series Korea Next. The episode, entitled "Finding Hallyuwood", explores the Korean wave phenomenon and garnered him a Best Director nomination at the Asian Television Awards in 2013.

Returning to English speaking roles, in 2014, he starred in a short film executive produced by Michelle Yeoh entitled Morning Star and the 2015 movie Ktown Cowboys which premiered at South by Southwest.

In 2016, Dulake starred in and produced Dramaworld, a co-production between Viki and Netflix about an American girl who gets sucked into her favorite Korean drama. Dulake portrayed Joon Park, the male lead in the in-show's K-drama. The show won "Most Popular Foreign Drama of the Year" at the Seoul International Drama Awards. Dulake returned in the second season, which premiered in March 2021.

He also co-wrote and played an American lieutenant colonel alongside Liam Neeson in the Korean War film Operation Chromite, which opened at number one in the Korean summer box office. The film was a box office hit in Korea, garnering a sequel The Battle of Jangsari set to be released in 2019 with Megan Fox and Kim Myung-min joining the cast.

Personal life 
He is cousins with South Korean actor Lee Byung Hun.

Filmography

Film

Television series

Awards and nominations

References

External links

1984 births
Living people
American male television actors
American male film actors
American male stage actors
Male actors from Los Angeles
American people of British descent
American people of South Korean descent
American male actors of Korean descent
American expatriates in South Korea
Boston University alumni